Neptunia is a resort town of the Costa de Oro in the Canelones Department of southern Uruguay.

Geography

Location
It borders the resort Pinamar-Pinepark to the east and the resort El Pinar of the Ciudad de la Costa to the west, across the stream Creek Pando.

Population
In 2011 Neptunia had a population of 4,774.
 
Source: Instituto Nacional de Estadística de Uruguay

References

External links
INE map of Salinas, Pinemar-Pinepark, Marindia, Neptunia and Villa Juana

Populated places in the Canelones Department
Seaside resorts in Uruguay